was a Japanese samurai of the Azuchi–Momoyama period. He was the second son of Oda Nobunaga. He survived the decline of the Oda clan from political prominence, becoming a daimyō in the early Edo period. Though often described as an incompetent general, Nobukatsu was a skilled warrior. In the battle of Komaki and Nagakute, he used a 13th-century tachi of the Fukuoka Ichimonji school, to slay a samurai known as Okada Sukesaburō, therefore the blade was known as "Okada-giri Yoshifusa", now a national treasure.

Biography
In 1570, Nobukatsu became an adopted heir of the Kitabatake clan and married a daughter of the former lord of Kitabatake, Tomonori. The true nature of this marriage was a condition of truce forced by the Oda clan to the Kitabatake clan. 

In 1575, Nobukatsu officially became the head of the family. The next year, he killed his father-in-law, imprisoned the previous lord, who was his father by adoption, and completely took over the Kitabatake clan.

In 1579, eager to achieve fame, Nobukatsu directed a first invasion of Iga, Iga Province, which only ended in disastrous failure and severe rebuke from his father. 

Two years later in 1581, Nobunaga himself led the second invasion with an army of several ten thousand, destroyed the whole region and placing control iga province in Nobukatsu's hands.

Death of Nobunaga
When Nobunaga and his heir, Nobutada, died at the Honnō-ji incident in 1582, problems arose about who would succeed the lordship of Oda clan. When Nobukatsu and his younger brother, Nobutaka, quarreled over the matter, a council decided on the infant son of Nobutada, Oda Hidenobu. The opinion of Toyotomi Hideyoshi was most influential on this decision.

At this point, Nobukatsu changed his surname back to Oda. He succeeded his father as lord of Mino, Owari, and Ise Provinces.

Decline of Nobukatsu

In 1583, during the succeeding chaotic years, Nobukatsu joined with Hideyoshi to destroy Oda Nobutaka. However, soon their relationship became hostile too, and Nobukatsu allied with Tokugawa Ieyasu to fight Hideyoshi in the Battle of Komaki and Nagakute in 1584. 
After more than a half year of battles, Hideyoshi persuaded Nobukatsu to make peace, offering him the security of the dominion. Nobukatsu took this offer and practically became a retainer of Hideyoshi. 

Later in 1590, when he served at the Odawara Campaign, he refused to accept Hideyoshi's order to change his dominion, and later he not only lost his original domain but was also forced to become a monk under the supervision of some Toyotomi retainers. A few years later, Hideyoshi's anger eased and Nobukatsu regained some land to rule. 

In 1598, He became the guardian of Toyotomi Hideyori after Hideyoshi's death. 

However in 1615, he betrayed the Toyotomi clan at the Siege of Osaka, and surrendered to Tokugawa Ieyasu. As a result, he was permitted to remain a daimyō by the Tokugawa shogunate. Though he is often described as an incompetent general, he managed to survive the series of upheavals. After the establishment of the Tokugawa shogunate, he became the lord of the Uda-Matsuyama Domain in Yamato Province (modern-day Nara Prefecture), and comfortably lived the rest of his life.

Family
Father: Oda Nobunaga (1534–1582)
Adopted Father: Kitabatake Tomonori
 Brothers:
 Oda Nobutada (1557–1582)
 Oda Nobutaka (1558–1583)
 Hashiba Hidekatsu (1567–1585)
 Oda Katsunaga (1568–1582)
 Oda Nobuhide (1571–1597)
 Oda Nobutaka (1576–1602)
 Oda Nobuyoshi (1573–1615)
 Oda Nobusada (1574–1624)
 Oda Nobuyoshi (died 1609)
 Oda Nagatsugu (died 1600)
 Oda Nobumasa (1554–1647)
 Sisters:
 Tokuhime (1559–1636)
 Fuyuhime (1561–1641)
 Hideko (died 1632)
 Eihime (1574–1623)
 Hōonin
 Sannomarudono(died 1603)
 Tsuruhime
 Daughter: O-hime (1585-1591), married Tokugawa Hidetada

See also
Rakusan-en

References

 Japanese Wiki article on Nobukatsu (18 Sept. 2007)

|-

Samurai
1558 births
1630 deaths
Oda clan
Tozama daimyo